Iran Air Tours Flight 956 was a Tupolev Tu-154M which crashed  south-west of Tehran on 12 February 2002. During a non precision approach to runway 11, the airliner impacted the Kuh-e Sefid Mountain at an altitude ,  left of the runway centerline. All 12 crew and 107 passengers were killed in the crash. The aircraft was carrying four government officials. It remains the 5th worst plane crash in Iranian history.

Aircraft 
The Tupolev TU-154 is the most widely used jetliner in Russia and is widely used throughout the region, generally seating 148 passengers. This crash was the 20th involving a TU-154 since it entered service in the 1970s. The involved aircraft was a TU-154M, with manufacturer number 91A-871, and serial number 08-71. Built by Aviakor, it made its first flight on 21 May 1991 and was delivered to the Ministry of Civil Aviation in June 1991, which assigned the aircraft registration number CCCP-85698 and sent it to the Azerbaijan Department. In 1993 the airliner was re-registered to 4K-85698, the aircraft registration for Azerbaijan as a result of the collapse of the Soviet Union.

After an overhaul, the aircraft was leased to pay for the work by ARZ-400, which in turn subleased it to the Bulgarian company Balkangtsev in May 2000. The registration was changed to LZ-LTO, and in December 2000, was subleased to another Bulgarian company, Bulgarian Air Charter (BAC), with the registration once again changed to LZ-LCO. On 21 January 2002, the airliner was subleased by BAC to Iran Air Tours, and the registration changed to EP-MBS. In total, by the day of the accident, the aircraft had accumulated 12,701 hours of flight time and 5516 cycles. It was equipped with three turbojet engines Soloviev D-30KU-154.

Crash 
Flight 956 of Iran Air Tours departed from Tehran to Horremabad at 7:30 a.m. with 12 crew members and 107 passengers on board. Among the passengers were 4 government officials and at least 4 Spanish passengers. The landing was carried out in bad weather conditions, with the crew deviating  from the left axis of the runway. All 119 occupants on board were killed. Firstly, newspapers mistakenly indicated 117 dead. It is said that the aircraft could not perform the required IFR approach due to the airport not having the Soviet style navigation aides and was performing a VFR approach instead in bad weather conditions. Based on the CVR, the copilot warned the captain of the aircraft warnings but was ignored because of captain's over-confidence

Aftermath 
Shortly after the accident there were calls for the resignation or dismissal of Transport Minister, Ahmad Khorram, as well as the head of the civil aviation organization Behzad Mazheri. About 150 deputies wrote a letter to President Mohammad Khatami, asking him to take the necessary measures to investigate the causes of the accident.

Another reason cited for the catastrophe was the American sanctions against Iran, which prevented Iranian airlines from sourcing spare parts for Boeing aircraft purchased before the 1979 Iranian Revolution. They were forced instead to operate aging post-Soviet era aircraft. Iran Air Tours announced that it was ceasing to operate Tupolev aircraft, but this action was never implemented.

References

External links
 Aviation Safety Network report

2002 disasters in Iran
2002 in Iran
Aviation accidents and incidents in 2002
Aviation accidents and incidents involving controlled flight into terrain
Accidents and incidents involving the Tupolev Tu-154
956
February 2002 events in Asia